1023 (one thousand [and] twenty-three) is the natural number following 1022 and preceding 1024.

In mathematics

1023 is the tenth Mersenne number of the form .

In binary, it is also the tenth repdigit 11111111112 as all Mersenne numbers in decimal are repdigits in binary. 

It is equal to the sum of five consecutive prime numbers 193 + 197 + 199 + 211 + 223.

It is the number of three-dimensional polycubes with 7 cells.

In computing
The Global Positioning System (GPS) works on a ten-digit binary counter that runs for 1023 weeks, at which point an integer overflow causes its internal value to roll over to zero again.

Floating-point units in computers often run a IEEE 754 64-bit, floating-point excess-1023 format in 11-bit binary. In this format, also called binary64, the exponent of a floating-point number (e.g. 1.009001 E1031) appears as an unsigned binary integer from 0 to 2047, where subtracting 1023 from it gives the actual signed value.

1023 is the number of dimensions or length of messages of an error-correcting Reed-Muller code made of 64 block codes.

See also 
The year 1023 AD

References 

Integers